Herman Ernst Henrik Gesellius (16 January 1874 – 24 March 1916) was a Finnish architect.

Biography
Gesellius graduated from the Polytechnical Institute in 1897. In 1896 he founded the architecture firm Gesellius, Lindgren, Saarinen with Armas Lindgren and Eliel Saarinen.

The most famous work projected under his own name is the Wuorio House ("Wuorion talo") at Unioninkatu 30, Helsinki. Gesellius designed it from 1908 to 1909, and Lindgren completed it from 1913 to 1914.

Gesellius withdrew from architectural work in 1912 because of a serious illness. He died in 1916 from a tuberculotic disease.

Works with Lindgren and Saarinen
 Thalberg House in Helsinki (1897–1898)
 Finnish Pavilion at Exposition Universelle in 1900, Paris
 Pohjola Insurance building in Helsinki (1900–1901)
 House of Physicians, now Agronomitalo, in Helsinki (1900–1901)
 Hvitträsk, home-atelier of architects in Kirkkonummi (1901–1904)
 National Museum of Finland in Helsinki (1905–1910)
 Club house for the Luther factory in Tallinn (1904–1905)
 Vyborg railway station (1904–1913), with Saarinen

Gallery

References

1874 births
1916 deaths
Architects from Helsinki
People from Uusimaa Province (Grand Duchy of Finland)
19th-century Finnish architects
20th-century Finnish architects
20th-century deaths from tuberculosis
Tuberculosis deaths in Finland